Thomas Vernon Hollingworth (27 July 1907 – 2 October 1973) was an American born English first-class cricketer. Hollingworth was a right-handed batsman.

Hollingworth made his first-class debut for Hampshire in 1929 against Surrey. Hollingworth's second and first-class appearance for Hampshire came against Lancashire.

Hollingworth represented the Europeans (India) in two Madras Presidency Matches against the Indians cricket team.

Hollingworth represented his adopted home county of Devon, making his debut in the 1933 Minor Counties Championship. From 1933 to 1939 Hollingworth played in seven matches for the club and represented the club in one match after the Second World War against the Kent Second XI.

Hollingworth died in Topsham, Devon on 2 October 1973.

External links
Thomas Hollingworth at Cricinfo
Thomas Hollingworth at CricketArchive

1907 births
1973 deaths
American emigrants to the United Kingdom
English cricketers
Hampshire cricketers
Devon cricketers
Europeans cricketers